The Dry Awarua River is a river of northern Fiordland, New Zealand. It rises in the McKenzie Range and flows south and then westward into the Waiuna Lagoon. The Lagoon then discharges into the Awarua River, which flows into Big Bay, also known as Awarua Bay. The Pyke - Big Bay tramping track crosses the Dry Awarua River.

See also
List of rivers of New Zealand

References

Rivers of Fiordland